Dorothy is an American rock band from Los Angeles, California, formed in 2014. The band consists of vocalist Dorothy Martin, drummer Jason Ganberg, guitarists Devon Pangle and Eli Wulfmeier, and bassist Eliot Lorango. They released their first project, a self-titled EP, in 2014. Rolling Stone deemed them "a [band] you need to know," and named them #14 on their 50 Best New Artists of 2014 list.

Career

2013–2014: Beginnings and Dorothy EP

In early 2013, Dorothy Martin was introduced to producer and guitarist Mark Jackson and his production partner Ian Scott by her cousin Sam Wofford, who was playing guitar at the time for Jackson's band, The Remedy. "When we heard Dorothy's voice, we were like, 'Holy shit — if we put this behind some serious old-school metal riffs, we'll have something big,'" said guitarist Mark Jackson in a November 2014 interview with Rolling Stone. Martin joked, "Basically, we want to make songs that we think Beavis and Butthead would like." Jackson and Scott called on their friend Gregg Cash to play bass.

What started as a piano ballad Dorothy had played for Jackson and Scott during one of their first meetings transformed into the band's hard-hitting debut "After Midnight". On June 10, 2014, the video for "After Midnight" premiered on Vice music network Noisey, dubbed as "the perfect modern rock concoction". The live performance video was shot at Swinghouse Studios in Hollywood by George Robertson and Aris Jerome. The video featured vocalist Martin donning her trademark fur coat, vintage T-shirt, and red lips.

The song spread quickly, climbing Hype Machine's music blog charts and gaining traction locally in Los Angeles as well as overseas. Dorothy fielded early comparisons to The Kills, The White Stripes, Patti Smith, and Grace Slick. London-based fashion publication Hunger TV commented "it feels good to know raw power, sex and whiskey is back en vogue".  On July 24, 2014, Huffington Post named "After Midnight" the #1 song on their 12 Songs You Need to Know This Week, calling them "dangerous", "kick-ass", and "exactly what rock needs".

In August 2014, the band was invited by Skullcandy to perform at select cities in Europe, including Paris, Berlin, and San Sebastián. On September 12, 2014, Vogue UK debuted a video using "After Midnight" starring English model and actress Suki Waterhouse. After breaking their song on LA radio, KCRW DJ and music director Chris Douridas invited Dorothy to perform during his weekly School Night series at Bardot in Hollywood on October 6, 2014. "A packed house moved increasingly closer to the stage while Dorothy, whiskey in one hand and microphone in the other, mesmerized the crowd with her powerhouse vocals", noted LA Weekly Pamela Chelin. "She's such a badass...like a revved up Adele teetering on the brink of chaos", said Douridas to Chelin.

On August 19, 2014, the band premiered its second single "Wild Fire" on IndieShuffle to great reviews. On October 27, 2014, Billboard premiered Dorothy's third single "Wicked Ones", comparing their bluesy, rock sound to Black Sabbath and The White Stripes. "You get a load of their easygoing cool and you're reminded that there have always been kids like them keeping rock edgy, albeit under the radar, far from mainstream attention", noted Chris Payne of Billboard. "Wicked Ones" became the band's most successful single thus far. It was the number-one trending indie rock song on SoundCloud, peaked at number four on the HypeMachine chart, and was selected by Skullcandy to lead a national ad campaign with James Harden.

On October 28, 2014, Dorothy released their debut self-titled EP, which was recorded in a spare bedroom at Scott's residence in Los Angeles. Following the release, they headlined a local residency at Bootleg Theater every Monday night in November. That month, they recorded a cover of Jay Z and Kanye West's "No Church in the Wild", and have since added it to their live performances, which have received rave reviews. Following the residency, Dorothy was named on Rolling Stones Artists You Need to Know list on November 24, 2014. "You really get the full energy from everybody, because they put their heart and soul into the performance", Martin told Rolling Stone. "It's more loose; it's not going to be exactly like the record. There's a lot of energy and vibe." In an interview with LA Weekly, Martin spoke on the band and overcoming stage fright. "I've always just wanted to sing and it was a long journey to get over the stage fright and find who I was", she says. "If you don't get knocked down, you can't stand up and say, 'I'm ready for this now.' I am fucking ready now. This is what I was meant to do. It's about fucking time. Let's go. This is the first band that has been serious and feels right. I'm not telling the world, 'Fuck me, fuck me.' Fuck you. I don't care if you think I'm hot or not, or want me to take my shirt off. I'm not going to. I'm going to grab the microphone and sing. That's what I came to do."

On December 30, 2014, Rolling Stone included Dorothy at number 14 on their 50 Best New Artists of 2014 list.

2015–2016: Rockisdead
On February 23, 2015, Complex premiered the "Wicked Ones" video. On March 5, 2015, Dorothy headlined a show at The Satellite in Los Angeles before a string of SXSW performances. They followed SXSW with an April residency every Monday night at The Satellite, bringing out supporters including Miguel, Tom Morello and Australian actress and model Ruby Rose. On June 16, 2015, Dorothy announced signing a recording deal with Roc Nation. The band also announced that they would go on tour with Miguel starting July 24. The band's song "Wicked Ones" has been used in television advertisements for Levi's and Gatorade. It also served as the theme song for WWE's 2015 pay-per-view TLC.

In February 2016, "Get Up" was used in the promos for Survivor: Kaôh Rōng. On June 24, 2016, Dorothy released their debut studio album, Rockisdead.

Dorothy went on tour as an opening act for Halestorm in the spring and fall. When the tour was announced, Halestorm's lead singer Lzzy Hale was quoted as saying, "I [...] welcome newcomers Dorothy who make me so proud of the future of rock."

In August 2016, Dorothy's song "Missile" was the soundtrack on the trailer for Series 2 of Poldark on BBC One.

2017–2019: 28 Days in the Valley

On May 5, 2017, Dorothy released "Down to the Bottom" a standalone single. The song would go on to be featured in Forza Horizon 4

On November 3, 2017, Dorothy's song "Naked Eye" was featured on the soundtrack for the documentary film Served Like a Girl.

In an interview with GSLM on December 20, 2017, Martin announced the band's second studio album, called 28 Days in the Valley. She described the album as having a "more feminine energy... It has a lighter and brighter feel, with less metal influence and more Stones. It has a cool desert vibe." The album was released on March 16, 2018, and a remixed version of the album's track "Freedom" (featuring Angel Haze and remixed by TROY NōKA) was released on April 26, 2019. In 2019, Dorothy went on tour with opener Spirit Animal.

On November 30, 2018, Dorothy appeared along with Dolly Parton on the soundtrack album for Parton's film "Dumplin'".

On November 8, 2019, Dorothy's song "Gun in My Hand" was featured in the 20/20 episode "Growing Up Buttafuoco".

2020–present: Gifts from the Holy Ghost and Thrive in the Darkness EP

On January 10, 2021, Martin announced via her Twitter account that her new album would be called Gifts from the Holy Ghost. In an interview with Loudwire, she revealed the name of the album came to her following an incident where she claimed to have witnessed her guitar tech die from a heroin overdose and then return to life. "I come out and see him and he's blue and green, and I knew he was dead at the moment. I just knew it, I don't know if anyone's had this experience. I'm pretty sure you know a dead body when you see one. [...] I'm just sitting there breathing and holding hands with my sound engineer. I'm like, 'Whoever's out there, just send him back. Give him another chance.' After a few moments of silence, this voice said to me, 'Okay, we're sending him back now.' And then I open my eyes, all the color had returned to his skin. He opened his eyes, and he was alive, and I couldn't believe it." Gifts from the Holy Ghost was released on April 22, 2022.

On June 6, an EP called Thrive in the Darkness was released, comprising four formerly released tracks - "Dark Nights", "After Midnight", "Wicked Ones" and "Raise Hell".

Alongside Mac Saturn, they are set to support Dirty Honey on the California Dreamin' tour in fall 2022.

Discography

Studio albums

Extended plays

Singles

Music videos

Band members
 

Current members
 Dorothy Martin – lead vocals (2014–present)
 Devon Pangle  – guitar (2019–present)
 Jason Ganberg – drums, percussion (2017–present)
 Eli Wulfmeier – guitar, backing vocals (2017–present)
 Eliot Lorango – bass, backing vocals (2014, 2017–present)

Former members
 Nick Perri  – guitar (2018-2019)
 Zac Morris – drums, percussion (2014–2016)
 Gregg Cash – bass guitar (2014–2017)
 Mark Jackson – guitar (2014–2016)
 Nick Maybury – guitar (2017-2018)
 Owen Barry  – guitar (2018)

Timeline

References

External links
 

2014 establishments in California
Hard rock musical groups from California
Musical groups established in 2014
Musical groups from Los Angeles
Musical quartets
Roc Nation artists